Supriya Kumar "Paul" Sinha (born 28 May 1970) is an English quizzer, comedian, doctor and broadcaster. He has written and performed extensively on Radio 4, and is one of the six Chasers on the ITV game show The Chase.

Early life
Supriya Kumar Sinha was born on 28 May 1970. He was educated at Dulwich College and St George's Hospital Medical School. Sinha is a former general practitioner, qualifying in the 1990s. While at medical school he developed a taste for the stage in St George's annual revue and refined his comedy as co-editor of the medical school newsletter, popularly known as the Slag Mag.

Career

Stand-up comedy
Sinha began performing stand-up while working as a junior doctor in hospitals in London and King's Lynn. His early material drew on his sexuality and ethnicity, with heavy use of puns. In 1999, he came third in the final of the Hackney Empire New Act of the Year.

After several years of combining touring with his nascent medical career, Sinha's breakthrough came with his second solo Edinburgh show, Saint or Sinha?, which earned him an if.comeddie nomination in 2006.

Edinburgh Festival Fringe shows
2004, Aspects of Love, Actually
2006, Saint or Sinha? (if.comeddie award nomination)
2007, King of the World
2009, 39 Years of Solitude
2010, Extreme Anti-White Vitriol
2011, Looking at the Stars
2015, Postcards from the Z List
2017, Shout Out To My Ex
2018, The Two Ages of Man
2022, One Sinha Lifetime

Radio
Sinha has performed many times on BBC Radio 4, on shows including The News Quiz, The Now Show, Loose Ends, 28 Acts in 28 Minutes, Shappi Talk and Just a Minute. His interest in football (he is a Liverpool F.C. fan) and cricket has led to appearances on Radio 5 Live, most notably on Fighting Talk, where he has won the Champion of Champions finale twice. He has also appeared on Talksport.

He has appeared as a guest on Midweek, Woman's Hour, Broadcasting House and as a political pundit on PM.

In March 2011, Sinha presented his own Radio 4 programme, Paul Sinha's Quiz Culture, in which he explored the world of competitive quizzing. His second documentary, The Sinha Test, aired on 14 July 2011 and examined patriotism and sporting allegiance. In July 2012, he wrote and presented a programme called The Sinha Games on BBC Radio 4 about the Olympic Games and his experience as a Londoner.

In December 2014, Sinha wrote and performed his first series on Radio 4, Paul Sinha's History Revision. A second series followed in May 2016, winning the Rose d'Or for Radio Comedy. The follow-up, Paul Sinha's General Knowledge, has completed its third series. In 2022, Paul Sinha wrote and starred in Paul Sinha's perfect pub quiz.

Sinha is a regular panellist on Round Britain Quiz, representing the South of England with Marcus Berkmann.

Quizzing
After an appearance on The Weakest Link (where he was voted off 4th), Sinha made appearances on University Challenge: The Professionals (lost), Are You an Egghead? (lost in first round), Mastermind (4th) and Brain of Britain (3rd). Sinha is currently ranked 7th in the National Quiz Rankings (as of 30 May 2017), and placed 11th in the 2018 World Quizzing Championships.

Sinha also plays in the Quiz League of London for the Gray Monks and in the Online Quiz League for Quiz Machine Kills Fascists.

The Chase

In 2011, Sinha joined the ITV quiz series The Chase as the fourth "Chaser", with the nicknames "The Sinnerman", "The Smiling Assassin" and "Sarcasm in a Suit". His first episode was broadcast in the fourth series on 8 September 2011. He also appears in celebrity and family editions of the show.

He has said he is more famous overseas (particularly in New Zealand) than in Britain, where The Chase is screened at 5pm before people are home from work.

Television 
In 2019, he appeared on Series 8 of Taskmaster, finishing in last place with 136 points. 
In January 2021, Sinha began hosting his own quiz show for ITV, called Paul Sinha's TV Showdown, featuring celebrities who go head to head together in a bid to answer as many questions as they can on TV knowledge. The show commenced on 9 January 2021, and concluded on 13 February 2021. A second series was commissioned and premiered 19 February 2022, releasing weekly until 2 April 2022.

Personal life 
Sinha was diagnosed with Parkinson's disease in May 2019.

Sinha is gay and on 14 December 2019, he married Oliver Levy.

References

External links
 
 
 Sinha's blog
 Sinha on chortle.co.uk

1970 births
20th-century English medical doctors
Alumni of St George's, University of London
British general practitioners
Contestants on British game shows
English male comedians
English people of Bengali descent
English people of Indian descent
English stand-up comedians
Gay comedians
English LGBT entertainers
People educated at Dulwich College
People from Luton
People with Parkinson's disease
20th-century English comedians
21st-century English comedians
Living people
British LGBT comedians